Alseodaphnopsis is a genus of flowering plants belonging to the family Lauraceae.

Its native range is Eastern Himalaya to Hainan and Indo-China.

Species:

Alseodaphnopsis andersonii 
Alseodaphnopsis hainanensis 
Alseodaphnopsis hokouensis 
Alseodaphnopsis lanuginosa 
Alseodaphnopsis marlipoensis 
Alseodaphnopsis petiolaris 
Alseodaphnopsis rugosa 
Alseodaphnopsis sichourensis 
Alseodaphnopsis ximengensis

References

Lauraceae genera
Lauraceae